William S. Frederick Mayers (1831–1878) was a British official and sinologist.

About
He was son of the Rev. Michael John Mayers, and was born on 7 January 1831 in Tasmania. At the time his father was colonial chaplain there, and was subsequently appointed consular chaplain at Marseille, where Mayers received most of his schooling.

After spending some years as a journalist in New York, Mayers in 1859 went to China as a student-interpreter, accompanying Lord Elgin to Beijing. and, after serving as interpreter to the allied commission charged with the government of Canton, was appointed interpreter to the consulate there.  He encountered Gustaaf Schlegel there in 1861. In 1864 he was at Shanghai, assisting with Harry Smith Parkes the Bakufu officials Moriyama Takichirō and Yamaguchi Shichijirō.

Mayers filled consular posts at Chinese ports until 1872, when he was made Chinese secretary of legation at Pekin. In the same year he visited England, and in August read a paper on the Pathays of Yünan before the geographical section of the British Association at Brighton.

Mayers in 1861 became fellow of the Royal Geographical Society; he was also a member of the Royal Asiatic Society,

He died on 24 March 1878 at Shanghai of typhus fever, and was survived by his wife.

Career
Mayers was a noted Chinese scholar. He wrote:

The Anglo-Chinese Calendar Manual, 1869.
The Chinese Reader's Manual, London 1874.
Treaties between the Empire of China and Foreign Powers, 1877.
The Chinese Government, Shanghai, 1878.

He collaborated with Henry Fletcher Hance, as sinologist and botanist.

In 1867, with Nicholas Belfield Dennys and Lieutenant Charles King, Mayers wrote The Treaty Ports of China, and in 1877 translated the Peking Gazette for that year. His official report on The Famine in the Northern Provinces of China was published as a parliamentary paper. He was a contributor to periodical publications, especially the China Review, published at Shanghai, He published in 1869 in the Journal of the Royal Asiatic Society a paper on the Lamaist Septem in Tibet.

Notes

External links
Online Books page

Attribution

1831 births
1878 deaths
19th-century British diplomats
British sinologists
19th-century British translators